Eucephalus glabratus is a North American species of flowering plant in the family Asteraceae with the common names of smooth aster, smooth wayside-aster, and Siskiyou aster. It is a perennial herb up to 60 centimeters (24 inches) tall, with branching rhizomes. Stems and leaves are hairless or nearly so. One plant will usually produce 3–8 flower heads per stem. Each head has 0–4 violet ray florets surrounding numerous yellow disc florets.

NatureServe classifies Eucephalus glabratus as Apparently Secure (G4) globally and Vulnerable (S3) in California. It has no state status rank for Oregon.

References

Astereae
Flora of Oregon
Plants described in 1889
Taxa named by Edward Lee Greene